Brison D. Gooch (March 1, 1925 – November 25, 2014) was an American historian specializing in 19th century European history, especially Belgium and France. He was author of numerous monographs, and especially wrote undergraduate oriented textbooks.

Born in Bar Harbor, Maine, his father Austin McLellan Gooch  was a carpenter. His mother Clara Helen Dowling Gooch cared for their six children, including his brother Alden Gooch. He was educated at local public schools. Gooch served in the U.S. Army in Germany and Belgium from 1945 to 1947; he attended the Nuremberg trials in 1945–1946. He took a bachelor's degree in history and philosophy from Miami University (Ohio) in 1949 and a master's degree in history from the University of Wisconsin in 1950. He finished with a PhD in history from Wisconsin in 1955. He taught as instructor and assistant professor at Massachusetts Institute of Technology, 1954 to 1960. He taught as an associate and full professor at the University of Oklahoma 1960–1969. He was professor from 1973 to 1990 at the history department of Texas A&M University. He worked to reform the curriculum and expand graduate efforts as history department head at the University of Connecticut from 1969 to 1973 and at Texas A&M from 1973 to 1975. He held a visiting appointment at Yale University, and was a Fulbright scholar in Belgium.

Bibliography
 "A Century of Historiography on the Origins of the Crimean War' American Historical Review, 62#1 (1956): 33-58 online
 "The Crimean War in Selected Documents and Secondary Works since 1940." Victorian Studies 1.3 (1958): 271-279 online.
 The new Bonapartist general in the Crimean War: distrust and decision-making in the Angle-French alliance. (The Hague: Nijhoff, 1959). online
 "Belgium and the Prospective Sale of Cuba in 1837" The Hispanic American Historical Review v39 n3 (1959): 413-427 online.
 Belgium and the February Revolution (The Hague: M. Nijhoff, 1963) online.
 Editor, Napoleon III, man of destiny : Enlightened statesman or proto-fascist? (Holt, Rinehart, Winston, 1964) online.
 New Bonapartist Generals : Distrust and Decision-making in the Anglo-French Alliance (Sordrecht: Springer, 1967).
 Editor, Interpreting European history. 1: From the Renaissance to Napoleon (Dorsey Press, 1967) online
 Editor, Interpreting European history. 2: from Metternich to Present (Dorsey Press 1967). online
 Editor, Interpreting western civilization. 1, From Antiquity to the Sun King (Dorsey Press, 1969).
 Editor, Interpreting western civilization. 2, From the Enlightenment to the Present (Dorsey Press, 1969).
 The reign of Napoleon III (Rand, McNally, 1969).
 Editor, The origins of the Crimean War (Heath 1969)
 Europe in the nineteenth century: a history (Macmillan, 1971).
 The nineteenth century, 1815-1914 (Forum Press, 1973).
 The world of Europe since 1815 with Amos E Simpson and Vaughan B Baker (Forum Press, 1973).
 "Recent Literature on Queen Victoria's Little Wars" Victorian Studies, 17#2 (1973): 217-224 online.
 "An 1853 Formula for Ottoman Victory" Austrian History Yearbook, v14 (1978): 79–88.
 Louis Napoleon and Strasbourg with Shirley Jean Black (Silverton, Colo.: Ferrell Publications, 2004).

References

1925 births
2014 deaths
Historians from Maine
Historians of Europe
20th-century American historians
American male non-fiction writers
People from Bar Harbor, Maine
University of Wisconsin–Madison College of Letters and Science alumni
MIT School of Humanities, Arts, and Social Sciences faculty
University of Oklahoma faculty
Texas A&M University faculty
University of Connecticut faculty
Miami University alumni
University of Wisconsin–Madison alumni
Historians from Texas
20th-century American male writers